Bermbach is a German language surname. Notable people with the name include:
 Adolph Bermbach (1822–1875), German lawyer and revolutionary
 Gregor Bermbach (1981), German bobsledder

References 

German-language surnames